Andreas Trautmann (born 21 May 1959) is a German former professional footballer who played as a midfielder. Trautmann spent much of his career with Dynamo Dresden, for whom he played 270 games in the DDR-Oberliga (the third most for the club, behind Hans-Jürgen Dörner and Reinhard Häfner, respectively). During this time he earned 14 caps for East Germany, and won the silver medal at the 1980 Olympics. After reunification, Trautmann moved west, joining Fortuna Köln alongside teammates Matthias Döschner and Hans-Uwe Pilz, but it did not work out, and he was back at Dynamo Dresden within six months. He played out his career across town with Dresdner SC, before retiring in 1994.

Honours
DDR-Oberliga: 1978, 1989, 1990
FDGB Pokal: 1982, 1984, 1985, 1990

References

External links

 
 

1959 births
Living people
Footballers from Dresden
People from Bezirk Dresden
German footballers
East German footballers
Dynamo Dresden players
SC Fortuna Köln players
Dresdner SC players
DDR-Oberliga players
East Germany international footballers
Association football midfielders
Olympic footballers of East Germany
Footballers at the 1980 Summer Olympics
Medalists at the 1980 Summer Olympics
Olympic silver medalists for East Germany
Recipients of the Patriotic Order of Merit in bronze